Withoos is a surname. Notable people with the surname include:

Matthias Withoos (1627–1703), Dutch painter
Alida Withoos (1662–1730), Dutch botanical artist, daughter of Matthias
Casey Withoos, singer
Johannes Withoos (1648 – 1688), Dutch painter 
Pieter Withoos (1655–1692), Dutch painter